Feathers is the debut play by Eliza Power, a modern retelling of the story of Tereus, Procne and Philomela from Ovid's Metamorphoses. The play premiered at the White Bear Theatre in London in July 2010. It then transferred to C Central at the Edinburgh Fringe Festival where it received critical acclaim.

References

External links 
 edfringe.com
 Feathers review in ThreeWeeks magazine
 broadwaybaby.com

2010 plays
Plays based on Metamorphoses